DAD-IS is the acronym of the worldwide Domestic Animal Diversity Information System of the Food and Agriculture Organization of the United Nations, within the FAO's management of animal genetic resources programme. It includes a searchable database of information about breeds, the Global Databank for Animal Genetic Resources; it also holds tools for management, and contacts for the National and Regional Coordinators for the programme. Data from the Global Databank is used for reporting on the global status and trends of animal genetic resources. The fourth version of the DAD-IS was launched on 21 November 2017.

Breeds in the Global Databank 
There were 11,116 mammalian national breed populations in DAD-IS as of February 2016, and 3,799 avian national breed populations. These national breed populations represent a global total of 8,822 breeds, which includes 643 breeds (7%) that are reported to be extinct.  local breeds (only found in one region) make up 7,761 of entries, while 1,061 are transboundary breeds, meaning they are found in more than one region.

Risk Status
A total of 17% (about 1,500) of all DAD-IS breeds are classified as being at risk of extinction, though this figure includes those that are  extinct but were entered into the database before disappearing. A further 58% are classified as being of unknown risk status.  these risk statuses have not been updated since 2014.

Number of Livestock Species and Breeds used for Food and Agriculture Worldwide

Figure 1: Total Number of Livestock Breeds by region. Local and regional transboundary breeds are combined and international transboundary breeds are ones that are found in more than 1 country. Note : Figures exclude extinct breeds. Figures for Alpaca, American bison, deer, dog, dromedary × Bactrian camel, guanaco, llama, vicuña, cassowary, Chilean tinamou, duck × Muscovy duck, emu, guinea fowl, ñandu, peacock, quail and swallow are combined in the “others” category. Source: FAO 2016 Status of Animal Genetic Resources-2016. http://www.fao.org/documents/card/en/c/c40d538b-4765-445d-ba3c-c06eaaa49f4a/

See also 
 List of horse breeds in DAD-IS.

External links
 DAD-IS homepage

References

Biodiversity databases
Information systems
Animals by conservation status
Agricultural organizations
Food politics
Food and Agriculture Organization
Agrarian politics
Environmental organisations based in Italy